An appeal to fear (also called argumentum ad metum or argumentum in terrorem) is a fallacy in which a person attempts to create support for an idea by attempting to increase fear towards an alternative. An appeal to fear is related to the broader strategy of fear appeal and is a common tactic in marketing, politics, and media (communication).

Logic
This fallacy has the following argument form:

Either P or Q is true.
Q is frightening.
Therefore, P is true.

The argument is invalid. The appeal to emotion is used in exploiting existing fears to create support for the speaker's proposal, namely P.  Also, often the false dilemma fallacy is involved, suggesting Q is the proposed idea's sole alternative.

Fear, uncertainty and doubt
Fear, uncertainty and doubt (FUD) is the appeal to fear in sales or marketing; in which a company disseminates negative (and vague) information on a competitor's product. The term originated to describe misinformation tactics in the computer hardware industry and has since been used more broadly. FUD is "implicit coercion" by "any kind of disinformation used as a competitive weapon." FUD creates a situation in which buyers are encouraged to purchase by brand, regardless of the relative technical merits. Opponents of certain large computer corporations state that the spreading of fear, uncertainty, and doubt is an unethical marketing technique that these corporations consciously employ.

As persuasion
Fear appeals are often used in marketing and social policy, as a method of persuasion. Fear is an effective tool to change attitudes, which are moderated by the motivation and ability to process the fear message. Examples of fear appeal include reference to social exclusion, and getting laid-off from one's job, getting cancer from smoking or involvement in car accidents and driving.

Fear appeals are nonmonotonic, meaning that the level of persuasion does not always increase when the claimed danger is increased. A study of public service messages on AIDS found that if the messages were too aggressive or fearful, they were rejected by the subject; a moderate amount of fear is the most effective attitude changer.

Others argue that it is not the level of fear that is decisive changing attitudes via the persuasion process. Rather, as long as a scare-tactics message includes a recommendation to cope with the fear, it can work.

See also

Appeal to emotion
Appeal to force
Culture of fear
Demagogue
Embrace, extend and extinguish
Fear appeal
Fear mongering
List of fallacies
Moral panic
Rape culture
Red Scare
Scareware
The terrorists have won

References

External links
 Propaganda critic: Fear appeal

Fear
Marketing techniques
Fear
Propaganda techniques